The men's freestyle 97 kilograms is a competition featured at the 2014 World Wrestling Championships, and was held in Tashkent, Uzbekistan on 9 September 2014.

This freestyle wrestling competition consisted of a single-elimination tournament, with a repechage used to determine the winners of two bronze medals.

Results
Legend
F — Won by fall
WO — Won by walkover

Final

Top half

Bottom half

Repechage

 Şamil Erdoğan of Turkey originally won the bronze medal, but was disqualified after he tested positive for Stanozolol. Javier Cortina was raised to third and took the bronze medal.

References
Official website

Men's freestyle 97 kg